The Shapiro–Francia test is a statistical test for the normality of a population, based on sample data. It was introduced by S. S. Shapiro and R. S. Francia in 1972 as a simplification of the Shapiro–Wilk test.

Theory 
Let  be the -th ordered value from our size- sample. Let  be the mean of the th order statistic when making  independent draws from a normal distribution. For example, meaning that the second-lowest value in a sample of four draws from a normal distribution is typically about 0.297 standard deviations below the mean.

Under the null hypothesis that the data is drawn from a normal distribution, this correlation will be strong, so  values will cluster just under 1, with the peak becoming narrower and closer to 1 as  increases. If the data deviate strongly from a normal distribution,  will be smaller.

This test is a formalization of the older practice of forming a Q–Q plot to compare two distributions, with the  playing the role of the quantile points of the sample distribution and the  playing the role of the corresponding quantile points of a normal distribution.

Compared to the Shapiro–Wilk test statistic , the Shapiro–Francia test statistic  is easier to compute, because it does not require that we form and invert the matrix of covariances between order statistics.

Practice 

There is no known closed-form analytic expression for the values of  required by the test. There, are however, several approximations that are adequate for most practical purposes.

Power 

Comparison studies have concluded that order statistic correlation tests such as Shapiro–Francia and Shapiro–Wilk are among the most powerful of the established statistical tests for normality. One might assume that the covariance-adjusted weighting of different order statistics used by the Shapiro–Wilk test should make it slightly better, but in practice the Shapiro–Wilk and Shapiro–Francia variants are about equally good. In fact, the Shapiro–Francia variant actually exhibits more power to distinguish some alternative hypothesis.

References

Statistical tests
Normality tests